Aux Anciens Canadiens is a restaurant in Quebec City, Quebec, Canada. Located on Rue Saint-Louis, at its corner with Des Jardins, the restaurant has occupied Maison Jacquet, originally a home completed in 1676, since 1966.

Building
The historic Maison Jacquet (Eng: Jacquet House), one of the largest houses in the upper town in its day, was built in 1675–76. The site was granted to François Jacquet on 30 November, 1674, by the nuns of the neighbouring Ursuline Convent. Originally made of wood, the property was rebuilt in cut fieldstone around 1699. 

The premises consist of two buildings, with that on the westernmost side being the newest, and that on the east dating back to the French Regime.

Several prominent figures have lived in Maison Jacquet, including the author of the novel Les Anciens Canadiens, Philippe-Aubert de Gaspé, who lived there from 1815 to 1824. Though it is contradicted by history, the myth persists that General Montcalm also lived and died in the building.

Gallery

References

External links
Official website
Aux Anciens Canadiens – Frommer's
Aux Anciens Canadiens – Fodor's
"Rare image found of Quebec's famous, Black, high-society barbers of the 1800s" – CTV News, YouTube, 5 February, 2021

Restaurants in Quebec City